This is a list of the Fall 1980 PGA Tour Qualifying School graduates.

Tournament summary 
Peter Teravainen, who played on the PGA Tour the previous season, missed qualifying by one shot. The European Tour then gave membership to the top 15 players who failed to qualify at PGA Tour Qualifying School. Teravainen accepted membership.

List of graduates 

Source:

References 

1980 2
PGA Tour Qualifying School
PGA Tour Qualifying School